Karl Joseph von Firmian (15 August 1716, in Trento – 20 July 1782, in Milan) was an Austrian noble, who served as Plenipotentiary of Lombardy to the Austrio-Hungarian Empire. His proper name was Karl Gotthard von Firmian, and in Italy known as Carlo Giuseppe di Firmian. He was the nephew of Leopold Anton von Firmian. 

 

He was also related to Leopold Maximilian von Firmian (1760-1831), Archbishop of Vienna. He was raised and educated in the Abbey School of Ettal in Bavaria, then in Innsbruck and Salzburg. He attended university in Leiden and well traveled through France and Italy. The aristocrat was recruited in 1753 by Francis I, Holy Roman Emperor as ambassador to Naples. Three years later, he was named plenipotentiary minister to Lombardy, and served for many years. He is remembered as an avid promoter of the arts and sciences, patronizing both the artists Johann Joachim Winckelmann and Angelica Kauffman. From the painter Andrea Salvatore Aglio, he commissioned a Virgin of Bovilli and a Birth of Maria de Medici, Queen of France, copy of the large canvas by Rubens. 

His tomb was placed in the church of San Bartolomeo in Milan. During the Napoleonic occupation of Lombardy, his monument was removed as part of an effort to expunge any signs of prior Austrian governance. After 1815, it was returned to its place. At his death, he had accumulated a large collection of paintings and a substantial library.

Works

Bibliography
Adriano Caprioli, Antonio Rimoldi, Luciano Vaccaro (a cura di), Diocesi di Como, Editrice La Scuola, Brescia 1986, 192, 195, 214.
Mauro Nequirito (a cura di), Trentini nell'Europa dei lumi: Firmian, Martini, Pilati, Barbacovi, Comune di Trento, Trento, 2002
Dizionario biografico Treccani

1716 births
1782 deaths
People from Trento
Austrian Empire politicians
Austrian untitled nobility
Austrian diplomats